The olive-tree warbler (Hippolais olivetorum) is an Old World warbler in the tree warbler genus  Hippolais. It breeds in southeast Europe and the Near East. It is migratory, wintering in eastern and southern Africa, from Kenya south to South Africa.

This small passerine bird is a species found in open-canopy oakwoods, olive groves, orchards and almond plantations. Three or four eggs are laid in a nest in a low tree or a bush.

This is a medium-sized warbler, similar to in size to the barred warbler, with a slightly longer bill and shorter tail. It is the largest Hippolais warbler, with a heavy bill, rather flat crown, long wings, and heavy legs. The adult has a dusty- or brownish-grey back and wings, and dusty-white underparts.

It feeds on invertebrates. Its song is a succession of loud creaks and squawks, lower in pitch than other Hippolais warblers, and slower in delivery.

The genus name Hippolais is from Ancient Greek hupolais, as misspelt by Linnaeus. It referred to a small bird mentioned by Aristotle and others and may be onomatopoeic or derived from hupo,"under", and laas, "stone". The specific olivetorum  is Latin for "of the olive groves ".

References

External links

 Olive-tree warbler - Species text in The Atlas of Southern African Birds.

olive-tree warbler
Birds of Southern Europe
Birds of Western Asia
Birds of Southern Africa
olive-tree warbler